is a 275-meter monadnock  located in the center of Fukushima, Fukushima, Japan.

Geography
Mt. Shinobu rises 275 meters from the surrounding flat Fukushima Basin.

Mt. Shinobu is 2.7 km long from east to west, 1.4 km wide from south to north, and has a circumference of seven kilometers.

Notes

Shinobu